Franz Golobic (7 April 1922 – 20 July 2010) was an Austrian international footballer.

References

1922 births
2010 deaths
Association football defenders
Austrian footballers
Austria international footballers
SK Rapid Wien players